Chains: Lesser Novels and Stories is a collection of short stories by Theodore Dreiser, first published in 1927.

Content
The fifteen short stories in the collection are:
"Sanctuary"
"The Hand"
"Chains"
"St. Columba and the River"
"Convention"
"Khat"
"Typhoon"
"The Old Neighbourhood"
"Phantom Gold"
"Marriage-For One"
"Fulfilment"
"Victory"
"The Shadow"
"The "Mercy" of God"
"A Prince Who Was a Thief"

Literary significance and criticism
Chains was Dreiser's second collection of short stories. It sold 12,000 copies in the first year, which has been deemed to have been a moderate success. 

Carl Van Doren described the stories as 'powerful'.

References

External links
 Full text of Chains: Lesser Novels and Stories at HathiTrust Digital Library

1927 short story collections
Books by Theodore Dreiser
Short stories by Theodore Dreiser